Aintree Motor Racing Circuit is a  motor racing circuit in the village of Aintree, Metropolitan Borough of Sefton, Merseyside, England. The circuit is located within the Aintree Racecourse and used the same grandstands as horse racing. It was built in 1954 as the "Goodwood of the North", hence the fact the two venues had so many things in common.

History
The circuit has hosted the Formula One British Grand Prix five times, in 1955, 1957, 1959, 1961 and 1962.

In addition to the Grands Prix, which were organised by the British Automobile Racing Club, the circuit also held eleven non-championship Formula One races, known as the Aintree 200, first won by Stirling Moss in 1954 with the last winner being Jack Brabham, in April 1964 (Brabham had made his Formula One debut at the circuit in the 1955 British GP). Aintree was the location for the famous race in 1955 in which Moss won his first British Grand Prix, driving a Mercedes. Two years later, he and Tony Brooks became the first British drivers to win both the British Grand Prix and a round of the Formula One World Championship whilst driving a British car, a Vanwall. The 1957 Grand Prix was also given the honorific "European Grand Prix" title and was the premier Formula One event of the season, attracting 150,000 spectators.

The full Grand Prix circuit was last raced on in 1964, but part of it – the  Club Circuit – is still open, having been operated by the Aintree Circuit Club from the mid-1960s to the late 1990s. In the 1980s the 108 Car Club (St. Helens) brought rallying back to Aintree Circuit revitalising the circuit's use with new and innovative ideas. A limited amount of motorsport continues today in the form of car sprints, track days and motorcycle racing on the Club Circuit.

The motorcycle events have been organised by Aintree Motor Cycle Racing Club since 1982, which runs six events at Aintree each year.

The car events are organised by Liverpool Motor Club in the form of three sprints, in May, June and September, and two track days in April and August on the Club Circuit. Nick Algar, the 2010 British Sprint Champion, set a new course record of 35.82 seconds on the  sprint course on 26 June 2010 in a Gould GR55 3500cc. The record was previously set by Roy Dawson on 8 September 2007 in the same car, in a time of 36.03 seconds. His record still stands despite several drivers attempting to beat it.

In addition, the Club Circuit sees occasional use by visiting events such as the Greenpower Electric Car Races for Schools, Sporting Bears Motor Club giving Dream Rides for charity, and also bicycle racing. The Club Circuit itself is situated within the Aintree Grand National Course, and in turn, contains a public nine-hole golf course operated by Aintree Racecourse.

Race lap records 
The fastest official race lap records at the Aintree Motor Racing Circuit are listed as:

References

External links 

Aintree Circuit Club
Liverpool Motor Club
Aintree Motor Cycle Racing Club
Aintree - Description and Image Gallery
Course guide on GG.COM
Course guide on At The Races
Aintree Motor Racing Circuit on Google Maps (Historic Formula 1 Tracks)

British Grand Prix
Formula One circuits
Motorsport venues in England